Midnight at Madame Tussaud's  is a 1936 British thriller film directed by George Pearson and starring Lucille Lisle, James Carew and Charles Oliver. The screenplay concerns an explorer who bets his friends he can spend a night in Madame Tussaud's chamber of horrors.

Plot summary
A daring explorer bets his friends he can spend a night in Madame Tussaud's chamber of horrors. Meanwhile, on the outside, his young female ward is in danger from an unscrupulous gang.

Cast
 Lucille Lisle as Carol Cheyne 
 James Carew as Sir Clive Cheyne 
 Charles Oliver as Harry Newton 
 Kim Peacock as Nick Frome 
 Patrick Barr as Gerry Melville 
 William Hartnell as Stubbs  
 Lydia Sherwood as Brenda 
 Bernard Miles as Kelvin, the Modeller

References

External links

1936 films
1930s thriller films
1930s English-language films
Films directed by George Pearson
British black-and-white films
Films set in London
Paramount Pictures films
Films shot at Highbury Studios
British thriller films
1930s British films